The August 2016 Western United States Wildfires is a natural disaster in the United States with flames engulfing California, Idaho, Montana, Nevada, Oregon, Washington and Wyoming.  Evacuations took place in Oregon, Nevada and Wyoming.

See also
2016 California wildfires

References 

2016 in Nevada
2016 wildfires in the United States
August 2016 events in the United States
July 2016 events in the United States
Wildfires in Nevada